De nakomer is a novel by Dutch author Maarten 't Hart. It was first published in 1996.

Novels by Maarten 't Hart
1996 novels